Eve Lister (1913 – 1997) was a British film and television actress. She was married to the actor Bernard Hunter.

Filmography

References

External links
 

1913 births
1997 deaths
English film actresses
English television actresses
Actresses from Brighton
20th-century English actresses